Emanuele Bindi (born 7 October 1981 in Pistoia) is an Italian former professional road bicycle racer.

In 2013, Bindi pleaded guilty for involvement in the Mantova doping investigation, and received a one-year ban on the preliminary hearing.

Major results

2003
 1st Stage 5 Ruban Granitier Breton
2007
 3rd Giro del Mendrisiotto
2011
 8th Overall Tour de Serbie

References

External links 

Italian male cyclists
1981 births
Living people
People from Pistoia
Sportspeople from the Province of Pistoia
Cyclists from Tuscany